Vasil Hristov Radoslavov (27 July 1854 – 21 October 1929) was a leading Bulgarian liberal politician who twice served as Prime Minister. He was Premier of the country throughout most of World War I.

Biography
Born in Lovech, Radoslavov studied law at Heidelberg and became a supporter of Germany from then on. He became a political figure in 1884 when he was appointed Minister of Justice in the cabinet of Petko Karavelov, also holding the position under Archbishop Kliment Turnovski. He succeeded Karavelov as Prime Minister in 1886 and being aged 32 years, was the youngest person to have ever been Prime Minister of Bulgaria. Additionally he was the Minister of Finance. His brief reign was marked by corruption and ultimately led to a split in the Liberal Party, with a Radoslav Liberal Party formed in 1887 as a grouping for right-wing liberals. Radoslavov was noted for his strong support for friendship with Austria-Hungary.

He returned to government in 1899 as Minister for Internal Affairs in the government of Todor Ivanchov, although after this he remained out of office until 1913 when he returned as Prime Minister. His anti-Russian rhetoric impressed Ferdinand who worked closely with Radoslavov in shaping foreign policy. He secured a large loan from Germany and Austria-Hungary in July 1914 but also managed to delay Bulgarian entry into the War. His popularity fell after Bulgaria officially entered the War, however, with money and resources now directed fully to the war effort. As Prime Minister he oversaw the liberation of Southern Dobruja and the occupation of Northern Dobruja in 1916 with the aid of German General August von Mackensen, although the move lost him some support from the German government as they wanted some of the territory for themselves. His government remained in office until June 1918, when the more moderate Aleksandar Malinov was recalled in the hope of brokering a favourable peace deal, with Radoslavov blamed for the failure of Bulgaria to gain full control of Northern Dobruja in the Treaty of Bucharest (the southern part of Northern Dobruja was ceded to Bulgaria, while the northern part of the region was placed under joint Bulgarian, Turkish, German and Austrian-Hungarian administration). By this point the Radoslavov government had become a by-word for corruption and subservience to Germany.

Radoslavov fled Bulgaria after the war, going into exile in Germany. In 1922 the regime of Aleksandar Stamboliyski sentenced him to death in absentia for his part in the defeat. He was pardoned in 1929, the same year in which he died whilst still in exile in Berlin, Weimar Republic, on 21 October. On 3 November, he was buried in Sofia.

See also
 Liberalism and radicalism in Bulgaria

References

External links
 

1854 births
1929 deaths
People from Lovech
Liberal Party (Bulgaria) politicians
Liberal Party (Radoslavists) politicians
Prime Ministers of Bulgaria
Foreign ministers of Bulgaria
Finance ministers of Bulgaria
Bulgarian people of the Balkan Wars
Bulgarian people of World War I
Treaty of Brest-Litovsk negotiators
Heidelberg University alumni
Members of the Bulgarian Academy of Sciences
Members of the National Assembly (Bulgaria)
People sentenced to death in absentia
Recipients of Bulgarian royal pardons
Bulgarian emigrants to Germany
Burials at Central Sofia Cemetery